Víctor Isla Rojas (born 7 August 1968) is a Peruvian lawyer, businessman and politician. He was a former Congressman representing the Loreto region for two terms, from 2006 to 2016 and was President of the Congress between 2012 and 2013. Before he became a congressman, he was the Vice Governor of Loreto serving between 2003 and 2006 and served as Provincial Councillor of Alto Amazonas.

Early life, education and career 
He was born in the district of Santa Cruz in the province of Alto Amazonas, Department of Loreto, Peru, on August 7, 1968, the son of Víctor Isla del Águila and Elena Rojas. He attended his primary and secondary studies in the city of Yurimaguas. From 1986 to 1992, Víctor Isla studied law and political science at the National University of San Marcos in Lima. From 1994 to 2002 he worked as an independent lawyer and outside adviser.

Political career

Early political career 
In the 1998 municipal elections, he was elected provincial councilor in his home province of Alto Amazonas under the We Are Peru party of Lima’s charismatic Mayor Alberto Andrade. In the 2002 regional elections, he was elected Vice Governor of the Loreto Region.

Congressman 
In the 2006 election, he was elected Congressman on the joint Union for Peru-Peruvian Nationalist Party list, representing the Loreto Region for the 2006–2011 term and after the elections, the alliance split and Isla sat on the Nationalist bench in Congress. Isla later returned to his alma mater to take a postgraduate course in constitutional and human rights laws from 2008 to 2009. In the 2011 election, he was reelected for the 2011–2016 term, this time on the Nationalist-dominated Peru Wins list. He was President of the Congress in 2012 for the annual 2012-2013 term.

Post-congressional career 
In the 2018 regional elections, he ran for Regional Governor of Loreto under the newly established Podemos Perú party, but was not elected, receiving only 1.6% of the vote in the election.

Controversies 
Isla has been linked to the government of Hugo Chávez, and to the Casa del Alba project in Peru. In that sense, even the political partner of the then Peruvian president Ollanta Humala, former Peruvian president Alejandro Toledo, expressed doubts about his candidacy for the presidency of the Congress. Isla was finally elected president of the congress for the period 2012-2013. Likewise, Isla was elected in 2006 as a congressman for Loreto; However, he did not gain prominence until it was revealed that he hired Martín Reátegui, a former member of the Shining Path, as an advisor.

References

External links
Official Congressional Site (2006-2011 term)
Congressional site 2011-2016 term
Resume on the National Jury of Elections (JNE) site

Living people
1968 births
We Are Peru politicians
21st-century Peruvian politicians
Union for Peru politicians
Peruvian Nationalist Party politicians
Members of the Congress of the Republic of Peru
Presidents of the Congress of the Republic of Peru
20th-century Peruvian lawyers
National University of San Marcos alumni
People from Loreto Region